The following are the telephone codes in Tunisia.

Calling formats
To call in Tunisia, the following format is used:

yy xxx xxx Calls within an area code

+216 yy xxx xxx Calls from outside Tunisia

00 international call prefix

List of area codes

References

Tunisia
Telecommunications in Tunisia
Telephone numbers